The Commercial, Technical and Allied Workers' Union (CTAWU) is a trade union in Saint Vincent and the Grenadines. It has a membership of 2000 and is affiliated with the International Trade Union Confederation.

References

Trade unions in Saint Vincent and the Grenadines
International Trade Union Confederation